Rajula Junction railway station  is a railway station serving in Amreli district of Gujarat State of India. It is under Bhavnagar railway division of Western Railway Zone of Indian Railways. Passenger and Superfast trains halt here.

Trains 

The following trains halt at Rajula Junction railway station in both directions:

 12945/46 Surat–Mahuva Superfast Express
 22993/94 Bandra Terminus–Mahuva Superfast Express
 22989/90 Bandra Terminus–Mahuva Express

References

Railway stations in Amreli district
Bhavnagar railway division
Railway junction stations in Gujarat